The Nipissing River is a river in the Saint Lawrence River drainage basin in the Unorganized South Part of Nipissing District in northeastern Ontario, Canada. The river is entirely within Algonquin Provincial Park, and is a left tributary of the Petawawa River.

Course
The river begins at Big Bob Lake in geographic Paxton Township and flows east, passes briefly through geographic Butt Township and geographic Devine Township, turns north into geographic Biggar Township, then back east, over Stewart's Dam and through the Allen Rapids, and into geographic Osler Township. It continues east over Graham's Dam, the High Falls and Gauthier's Dam, enters geographic Lister Township, flows over the Perley Dam and Rolling Dam, and empties into Cedar Lake on the Petawawa River, across the lake from the community of Brent. The Petawawa flows via the Ottawa River to the Saint Lawrence River.

Tributaries
Plumb Creek (right)
Nadine Creek (left)
Osler Creek (left)
Coldspring Creek (right)
Kelley Creek (left)
Gibson Creek (left)
Squawk Creek (right)
Wolfland Creek (left)
Beaverpaw Creek (right)
Shag Creek (right)
Loontail Creek (right)
Chibiabos Creek (right)

See also
List of rivers of Ontario

References

Sources

Rivers of Nipissing District
Tributaries of the Ottawa River